Gosic or GOSIC can mean:

Global Observing Systems Information Center
Gošić, a hamlet in Croatia
Dragan Gošić (born 1981), Serbian footballer